Eggum is a surname. Notable people with the surname include:

Arne Eggum (born 1936), Norwegian historian
Jan Eggum (born 1951), Norwegian singer and songwriter
Knut Eggum Johansen (born 1943), Norwegian civil servant

Norwegian-language surnames